Brisbane Roar Football Club is an Australian professional soccer club based in Brisbane, Queensland and has won the domestic title on three occasions, as well as holding the longest unbeaten record of 36 league matches without defeat.

Brisbane competes in the country's premier competition, the A-League, and has Warren Moon as manager.

The club has a shared history with Queensland Lions F.C. who competed in the inaugural A-League season as Queensland Roar.

Background
Formed in 1957 as Hollandia-Inala by Dutch immigrants, the club became 'Brisbane Lions' and then transitioned into Queensland Roar, playing under that name from the inaugural 2005–06 season of the A-League until the 2008–09 season before finally becoming 'Brisbane Roar'.

Since joining the A-League, the club has won two league Premierships, three Championships and has competed in five AFC Champions League competitions.

Brisbane Roar holds the record for the longest unbeaten run at the top level of any Australian football code, which stands at 36 league matches without defeat. Brisbane Roar are also the first and only club to win back to back Hyundai A-League Championships, and are the only club not have lost the Grand Final in the Hyundai A-League.

The club plays home matches at  Moreton Daily Stadium. In March 2018, the club relocated its Playing and Administration Headquarters to a purpose built, $9 million Center-of-Excellence in Logan hosting training, sports science and medical facilities for the A League team, W-League team and over 16 youth development teams; the new CoE also host the club's administration staff as well.

The youth team competes in the National Youth League and the women's team competes in the W-League. Commencing in 2014, the youth teams also compete in the NPL Queensland in order to provide sufficient matches to further develop their abilities. The youth team competes in the senior men's NPLQ division while the women's team compete in the NPLQ-W. The youth matches are typically played Roar's CoE while women's matches are played at various locations across Brisbane, including Heritage Park, Goodwin Park, QSAC, A.J. Kelly Park, Perry Park and occasionally Suncorp Stadium.

History

Foundation as Hollandia-Inala F.C. (1957–1970s)

The origins of Brisbane Roar are traced back to the founding of Hollandia F.C. by Dutch immigrants in 1957. The club competed under this name for almost 20 years until, in the interest of inclusiveness and because perceptions that members of the public saw soccer as a migrants' game, all clubs were required to adopt non-ethnic names after a ruling by the Queensland Soccer Federation in 1973.

Brisbane Lions F.C. (1973–2004)

The club continued to be based in the Brisbane suburb of Richlands. After adopting the name Brisbane Lions in the 1970s, the club joined the National Soccer League (NSL) as one of the founding clubs in the 1977 season and competed until the end of the 1988 season before reverting down to the Brisbane Premier League thereafter.

In the 1990s, the club again changed its name to Queensland Lions after coming to an agreement with the Australian rules football club, Brisbane Lions.

At the end of the 2004 season, Queensland Lions withdrew from the local Senior Men's competition to compete in the new National A-League as Queensland Roar. The Premier Youth team remained in the local soccer league.

For the next 3 seasons the senior Lions F.C. men's team was the Brisbane Roar but after 3 financially challenging years, Queensland Lions relinquished ownership of the Roar and reformed their men's team in the local Senior Men's competition.

Entering the A-League (2004)
Lions F.C. entered the A-League as Queensland Roar as a foundation member in 2004. The club continued to be based at Richlands where club administration and player training continued.

At the time of conception of the A-League, teams from several capital cities were preferred to form the foundation clubs. By June 2004, two of the twenty submissions for joining the league were sought by partnerships formed in Brisbane, the capital of Queensland. On 1 November 2004, the group headed by Queensland Lions were chosen as operators of the Brisbane team. On 2 March the following year, Queensland Roar FC were officially announced.

The board consisted of chairman John Ribot, a former CEO of both National Rugby League clubs Brisbane Broncos and Melbourne Storm, deputy chairman Gary Wilkins, former Queensland and Australian international player, and CEO Lawrence Oudendyk, who was also Queensland Lions CEO.

Early A-League years (2004–2009)

Miron Bleiberg was appointed as the inaugural manager on 2 March 2005. Under pressure from the fans to deliver on his promises of attractive, attacking and successful soccer he resigned on 12 November 2006 following a poor start to the 2006–07 season.

After much speculation, Bleiberg was replaced by former Australian national team coach, Frank Farina just three days after Bleiberg's resignation.

Frank Farina's arrival led to a mini-revival which saw the club narrowly miss out on what would have been the Roar's first finals appearance, on goal difference. The 2007–08 season, however, saw Farina make up for the shortfall of the previous season, qualifying for the finals for the first time in the club's history. A memorable performance in the second leg of the semi-final saw the Roar defeat arch rivals 2–0 (2–0 agg.) Sydney FC in front of a (then) club record 36,221 fans to qualify for the preliminary final against the Newcastle Jets. The Roar would controversially lose 3–2 to the Newcastle side, who would ultimately go on to win the Grand Final. Farina again qualified for the finals in 2008–09, where the Roar dispatched of Central Coast Mariners 4–2 on aggregate, however they ultimately lost, again in the preliminary final, to Adelaide United after failing to capitalise on their dominance.

On 10 October 2009, Farina was arrested by Queensland Police for drink driving. He was initially suspended by the Roar and asked to show cause as to why he should not be sacked for tarnishing the name of the club. It was announced that assistant manager, Rado Vidošić would step into a caretakers role until a decision had been made which would include the M1 Derby, which the Roar lost 1–0 at home. Farina was ultimately sacked on 14 October 2009, with the club tasked with finding a replacement for the remainder of the 2009–10 season.

Renamed Brisbane Roar (2009)
In 2009, the club was officially renamed to Brisbane Roar Football Club due to two other Queensland-based clubs entering the A-League competition; that being Gold Coast United and North Queensland Fury.

This was the club's fifth change of name after Hollandia-Inala F.C., Brisbane Lions F.C., Queensland Lions F.C., and Queensland Roar F.C.

Postecoglou era (2009–2012)

Ange Postecoglou arrived mid-season armed with the task of picking up the pieces of a season in tatters. Postecoglou's first season ended as the worst in the club's short history, finishing second from the bottom. Postecoglou completed a turn-around in the 2010–11 season. He made wholesale changes to the squad, commencing with the replacement of the "old-guard" of Charlie Miller, Craig Moore and Danny Tiatto and brought in his own squad which was a mixture of youth and talented experience. Under his brand of possession/attacking soccer, he led the team to win the club's inaugural premiership and go on to complete the club's first Double by also wrapping up the championship in a memorable 2011 A-League Grand Final in front of a then club record 50,168 supporters. The club went on an Australian sporting record 36-match unbeaten run which commenced in the 2010–11 season and ran through to the 2011–12 season. After much speculation on his future at the club, it was reported that Postecoglou had signed a three-year contract extension.

With such a successful season behind him, there was much talk as to whether the Roar could equal or better that in the 2011–12 season. Their title credentials were in doubt when the club went on a club-record worst losing streak of five matches immediately following the ending of their record 36-match unbeaten streak. Postecoglou remained steadfast in the club's philosophy and the club went on to record just one loss in the last 14 games of the regular season to finish league runners-up. Unable to retain the Premiers Plate, Postecoglou led the club to back-to-back championships in the 2012 A-League Grand Final in front of a club-record 50,344 supporters. Postecoglou also led the Roar's initial foray into the 2012 Asian Champions League as reward for their success in the previous season. Success was mixed, picking up two draws from four matches.

On 24 April 2012, Postecoglou left the club by way of mutual consent, citing a desire to seek "a new challenge". Ange leaves the club as the most successful manager in the club's history.

On 26 April 2012, it was reported that Postecoglou did not, in fact, sign a new contract at the conclusion of the 2010–11 season due to the uncertainty around the club's ownership at the time. That allowed his original two-year contract with the club to expire at the conclusion of the 2011–12 season and leave to join Melbourne Victory without the Victory needing to pay out his "contract" with the Roar.

Mulvey era (2012–2014)
On 25 April 2012, Rado Vidošić was promoted to the manager's position after serving seven years as Assistant Manager under the three previous managers before him. On 18 December 2012, Vidošić was removed as coach, taking up the role of technical director for the club, with Mike Mulvey, then coach of the Melbourne Victory women's named as his replacement. Vidošić was only manager for 13 matches before transferring to the new role, similar to the one offered to Postecoglou before his exit earlier in 2012. At the end of the 2012–13 season, the Roar finished in 5th place, carried by striker Besart Berisha's 14 goals during the season. The club made it to the semi-finals in the finals series, bowing out to premiers Western Sydney Wanderers 2–0.

The 2013/14 season began in terrific style, with the Roar winning 8 of their first 10 games. This form continued for the rest of the season as the club became dominant premiers. Players like Ivan Franjic, Luke Brattan and Dimitri Petratos shone while the return of former captain Matt McKay bolstered the midfield. Brisbane won the grand final 2–1 after extra time against Western Sydney Wanderers. Club talisman Besart Berisha and star utility Ivan Franjic would leave the club over the off-season for Melbourne Victory and Torpedo Moscow respectively.

Frans Thijssen (interim) 2015
After a run of poor results at the beginning of the 2014–15 season, Mulvey stepped down from the head coach role. Frans Thijssen was appointed caretaker coach for the remainder of the season.

Thinssen's first game in charge was a 1–1 draw against Perth Glory and ended with a 1–2 defeat against Urawa Red Diamonds. In total Thijssen was in charge for 28 games, winning eleven, drawing five and losing twelve.

Captain Matt Smith left the club in December to join Bangkok Glass, and was replaced by former captain and club favourite Matt McKay. The season ended with the club recovering to finish in 6th position and qualify for the finals series. Brisbane were knocked out by Adelaide United in the elimination final 2–1.

Aloisi era (2015–2018)
On 26 May 2015, John Aloisi was appointed head coach. Amidst off-field drama regarding the club's ownership during his first season as head coach, Aloisi led the Roar to an encouraging 3rd place on the ladder, narrowly missing out on the championship in the last game of the season and finishing only one point behind eventual champions Adelaide.

The 2015/16 performance was sufficient for the Roar to enter qualification for the 2017 Asian Champions League. After defeating Global F.C. and Shanghai Greenland Shenhua F.C. in 2017, Brisbane qualified for the ACL Group Stage for the fourth time in their history. Brisbane were knocked out in the group stage, winning just 1 match, and losing four, including a 6–0 to Ulsan Hyundai FC. This 6–0 loss, coupled with the Western Sydney Wanderers' 5–1 loss to Shanghai SIPG F.C. on the same day led to Fox Sports commentators Mark Rudan and Mark Bosnich labelling the matchday as "the darkest day in Australian club football".

Brisbane Roar's 2017/18 season started amid concerns over the quality of player signings, with the signing of former Serie A marksman, Massimo Maccarone, and former Ligue 1 duo, Fahid Ben Khalfallah, and, Eric Bautheac. Roar's first competitive match of the season was a round of 32 FFA Cup tie with Melbourne Victory FC at local ground, Perry Park. The home side started with an experimental side with some players playing in positions they were not usually deployed in. The game ended in a shambolic fashion for Aloisi's side, who lost 1–5 to their Melbourne opponents with the only positive coming from Petros Skapetis, who scored his first goal for the club with a shot coming from outside of the box and nestling in the top left corner of the Victory net. The season did not improve much with Brisbane without a win after 6 matches creating their worst ever season start. The Roar finally got their first win of the season at home to Melbourne City FC , the score was 3–1 with central defender, Avraam Papadopoulos scoring an unlikely brace. Brisbane Roar slowly climbed the A-league ladder with wins against Western Sydney Wanderers FC, Adelaide United FC, and, Perth Glory FC in the new year.

After finishing third on the A-league table in the 2016–17 season, Brisbane Roar gained entry into the second qualifying round of the Asian Champions League where they were drawn against Filipino, Ceres-Negros F.C. The match was to be played at the Queensland Sport and Athletics Centre. This match proved to be arguably the worst moment in the club's history with the Roar crashing out of the competition at the hands of the Filipino side.

After this horror show, Brisbane Roar's results slightly improved with more wins against Central Coast Mariners FC, Adelaide United FC, and surprise victories over then current champions and future premiers, Sydney FC and future grand final winners, Melbourne Victory FC. Brisbane ended the regular season with wins over Central Coast Mariners, and, Perth Glory. Brisbane Roar scraped a sixth-place finish on the table earning just two more points than seventh placed Western Sydney Wanderers. This sixth-place finish gave the Roar qualification for the A-League Finals Series, where they played Melbourne City in a preliminary final away. The Brisbane-based side put on a poor display and were outplayed with the performance being reflected on the scoreline, 2–0.

The post season review saw numerous changes behind the scenes. The club finally moved in to its purpose built $10m City of Logan training facility in time for pre-season training and a new strength & conditioning coach was hired (from Western Sydney Wanderers), along with a former English Premier League physiotherapist. In addition, Darren Davies was appointed second assistant coach at Aloisi's request.

In addition new player signings were made early, avoiding mistakes of previous seasons, with 21/23 players reporting for pre-season training and – amid growing optimism for the new season with Aloisi promising to turn Suncorp Stadium in to a "fortress" – membership and club sponsorship approached record levels.

Aloisi's team again exited the FFA Cup at the first hurdle, losing 0–1 at home to Melbourne City despite having been back in pre-season training for 6 weeks prior to the game. The game was held at Dolphin Oval in Redcliffe in front of a club record FFA Cup home crowd of 6,151

Ahead of the new season Aloisi was very optimistic about Roars chances following a near-perfect pre-season free from off-field distractions with Aloisi claiming his side "has never been better".

The season opened with a tense, come-from-behind 1–1 draw vs Central Coast Mariners in front of nearly 15,000 fans. Mariners would go on to record the worst ever start by any A-League club ever, a poor start that subsequently would only be slightly worse than Aloisi's Roar side. A second home game the following week saw a dire 0–0 draw vs Wellington Phoenix in front of more than 15,000 fans. The next two games were away from home with a come from behind 2–2 draw away to Western Sydney Wanderers at the Glen Willow Sports Complex, followed by a 1–2 defeat at Perth Glory.

After the first 4 games, all against sides who had failed to make finals the previous season, Roar were winless with 3 points but then managed a 2–0 home win against Melbourne City, who had sacked John Aloisi for poor results five years earlier, putting Roar into a finals ladder position for the first time.

Roar would go on to lose their next 4 games under Aloisi, including conceding four goals in consecutive matches, to slump to 9th on the ladder.

As the season start went from bad to worse, Aloisi had to defend his team from multiple criticisms including that many players were too old and generally over the team's very poor start; with fan discontent increasing the pressure on Aloisi increased.

On 28 December 2018, despite having received a "vote of confidence" from the Board two weeks earlier, John Aloisi resigned as manager of Brisbane Roar following the club's poor start to the season, with the Roar second-last on the A-League ladder with just 1 win in 9 matches at the time of his departure and in the worst start to a season ever by a Brisbane Roar team.

He left as Brisbane Roar's longest serving manager. But after a promising first season the statistics showed that in subsequent seasons goals per game declined, the number of passes attempted and completed declined. and disciplinary issues increased

Darren Davies (interim) 2019
Following Aloisi's departure, Darren Davies was appointed interim head coach for an unspecified period. Davies tenure began with an encouraging 1–2 defeat away to Sydney FC and a 2–2 draw away to Newcastle Jets.

In April 2019 the club announced Robbie Fowler as the new head coach with Davies to take charge for the one remaining A-League game on ANZAC Day.

Davies final game in charge ended with a 5–3 home defeat by Adelaide United in front of almost 12,000 fans including new head coach, Robbie Fowler. Davies' coaching record reads Played 18, Won 3, Drawn 3 and lost 12, scoring 28 goals whilst conceding 54.

The final season of the Aloisi/Davies era saw Roar finish 9th on the ladder with a respectable home attendance of 9,632, the 4th best in the competition that season.

Fowler era (2019–2020)
The club announced the appointment of Robbie Fowler as head coach on 23 April 2019. It was also announced that Tony Grant would be joining the coaching team alongside Fowler and current interim coach, Darren Davies.

Shortly after Fowler's appointment the club announced a massive clear out of playing staff with 14 players released in late April 2019 including marquee signing Eric Bautheac.

In June 2019 Fowler announced his first signing in Roy O’Donovan from Newcastle United Jets.

Fowler's first competitive match came in a shock 0 - 2 away win at reigning A-League Champions Sydney FC on 7 August 2019 in the FFA Cup.

On 29 June 2020 Roar announced Fowler would not be returning to Roar after departing during the COVID-19 crisis. Fowler left with a 45% win record, with 10 wins from 22 A-League games.

Warren Moon era (since 2020)
Following the departure of Robbie Fowler, the club announced internal appointment, Warren Moon, as permanent replacement and would manage the senior men’s team on an open-ended contract. Moon would also maintain his current role as Academy Head. Moon is an “A-League Foundation Player” having played 16 games in Roars first season in the competition.

Crest and colours

During the first two seasons the Roar played in a predominantly orange home strip with blue shorts and maroon socks. Queensland sporting teams traditionally play in maroon but the original home strip kept with the colours used by the team in its earlier incarnations. The colours of orange and blue honour the club's Dutch origins. On 31 July 2007 the club announced that it had ordered a strip that was half orange and half maroon, but that the colours were manufactured for prominence on television. For season three the home kit had been redesigned, the home strip is still orange but features maroon sleeves, the shorts are maroon instead of blue and orange socks are worn. Danny Tiatto and Craig Moore modelled in the strip launch on 1 August 2007

Before the 2009–10 A-League season, in accordance with the name changing of the club from Queensland Roar to Brisbane Roar, the club's logo was also changed with "Queensland" being dropped to make way for "Brisbane". On 20 May 2009, Reinaldo and Sergio van Dijk unveiled a new kit for the club, which would be worn for the next two seasons. The club stuck with the maroon and orange they had used for the last kit, but instead opted to drop the white slashes on the home kit. The orange used for the previous kit was brightened to the one used in season 1 of the A-League, with the design of both the new home and away kits changing. The slashes were dropped for a shoulder-pad style. The maroon shoulder pads would be displayed on an orange body, with maroon shorts. This was reversed on the away kit, with the shoulder-pads being orange on a white body with orange shorts.

Prior to the 2011–12 A-League season, the club announced that maroon, which had featured in some way on the club's kits since the A-League inception, would be removed and replaced with black. On 5 September 2011, the club released their kits for the upcoming season. The club showed off their home kit, which was orange with black diagonal shoulders with a thin, white line under the black. This was supported by orange with black banded socks. The away kit would turn out to be predominately black, with only the orange shoulders on the top with the white line underneath and the black with orange banded socks. The same pants would be used for both the home and away kits, which would sport two orange bands and a white band on black pants. The kits released were almost identical to the same design used by Tottenham Hotspur during their 2010–11 season with the only difference being full diagonal sashes and a collared neck instead of a "V" neck.

After two seasons in the diagonally sashed kit, both yielding Final Series soccer, the first season, winning the Grand Final, Puma released a new set of kits, including, for the first time, an alternative strip, deemed by the club as an "Event" kit. The home kit consisted of the usual orange, with black sides, black arm cuffs and a black V-neck collar, which also had a white piece of round-collared fabric attached, which had 3 centrally based lines, white in the centre, orange on the left and black on the right with white on the outside of the black and orange lines. The away kit reverted to the white with orange sides, black arm cuffs and a black V-neck collar. As with the home kit, the away kit had an orange piece of collared fabric attached to the collar, which had 3 centrally based lines, orange in the middle with a white stripe on the left and black on the right of the orange stripe with orange on the outside of the black and white lines. The alternative, or "event" strip, was silver with a top left to bottom right, orange diagonal sash. It also had black arm cuffs and a black V-neck collar with the inner silver fabric and the 3 centrally based stripes. Silver stripe in the middle with a black stripe on either side of the silver stripe and silver on the outside of the two black stripes.

On 15 August 2014, before the 2014 FFA Cup game vs Stirling Lions of the 2014–15 season, the Roar would reveal that Umbro would be making their kits for the next 4 years, ending a 4-year tenure with Puma. Two days later, Brisbane Roar changed their logo to a more "traditional" shield type crest, the biggest change since the club was renamed ahead of the 2009–10 season. The revelation received mixed reviews, some saying it lost the plastic, American franchise logo feel and some saying it was too bland and that not enough time was put into it. Another 2 days later, the Roar released their new Umbro home kit, ditching the black pants and going with an all orange kit. The top was completely orange with white piping on the collar; the pants were orange as well with a white vertical strip going 3/4 of the way up the sides of the pants from the bottom, topped off with orange socks.

Sponsors

On 30 November 2007, the club signed a two and a half-year deal with cafe chain The Coffee Club to be their main shirt sponsor. The Coffee Club would re-sign with the Roar in August 2010 for another 3 years, making it one of the longest sponsorship deals in the A-League. After the club's licence was taken back by Football Federation Australia in March 2011, the Coffee Club committed their future to the club, signing a $2 Million dollar, 3-year contract extension, sealing their future as sponsors until at least 2015.

At the conclusion of the 2010–11 A-League season, the League's collective kit deal with Reebok came to an end meaning that all A-League clubs could enter into their own separate kit manufacturer agreements. On 2 August 2011, the Roar announced that Puma would be the club's first kit manufacturer decided by the club, and agreed to a three-year deal with the sports brand. The club announced that Puma would manufacture the official playing kits for all Brisbane Roar teams, including the Youth and Women's teams as well as replica kits and other merchandise.

Before the start of the 2014/15 A-League season Brisbane Roar announced that Umbro would be replacing Puma as the club's playing kit and apparel partner for the next four seasons.

On 24 February 2015, it was announced that Griffith University would be the principal kit Sponsor for the 2015 AFC Champions League campaign.

On 3 July 2015, it was announced that former front shirt sponsor, The Coffee Club would not renew its sponsorship with the club for the 2015/16 season. It was then announced that Ladbrokes would be the front shirt sponsor for the Roar's friendly against Liverpool on 17 July 2015.

Steadfast were announced as "Principal Partners" and "Front of Shirt Sponsors" by the club on 10 August 2015 for the duration of the 2015–16 A-League season. Steadfast had previously sponsored the rear of the men's teams' shirts and this new partnership would see the Steadfast logo feature on the shirts of all three Brisbane Roar teams.

Season 2017/18 commenced without a formal sponsor in place so the Roar featured the Starlight Children's Foundation branding on the front of its kits for the initial rounds of the 2017–18 A-League season.

In February 2018 Roar announced Central Home Loans (CHL) had been secured as principal partner and would feature on the front of the men's shirt for the remainder of the season

in July 2018 Roar announced Australian company ActronAir as principal partner, with the company logo to be displayed on the front of the men's shirt as well as feature on the women's team shirts. The value of the two-year deal was undisclosed.

Commercial painting company BBC Painting was later signed as Platinum Partner and back-of-shirt sponsor for the 2019 season.

Stadium and facilities

Dolphin Oval
Roar have hosted home games at Dolphin Oval in Redcliffe including their 2018 FFA Cup game versus Melbourne City, and again in 2019 versus Central Coast Mariners.

Prior to the release of the 2019–20 season fixtures the club announced three games would be switched from Suncorp Stadium to Dolphin Oval increasing their use of the stadium from FFA Cup and W-League matches. The Club have since moved all A-League Home Games to the Stadium.

The stadium has a capacity of 10,000 including 7,000 seated.

Potential New Stadium
On 6 February 2020 Roar announced plans to fund a $60m boutique stadium of their own.

Alternative stadiums
Throughout their history Roar have hosted games at alternative venues including Cbus Stadium and Perry Park; typically for FFA Cup games and ACL matches.

At the beginning of the 2010–11 Season, during negotiations with the operator of Suncorp Stadium, there were suggestions that the club may move its home games to Ballymore Stadium where the club then had its administration and training facilities. However, the owners of the club opted to stay at Suncorp Stadium on a new restructured contract that would ensure the financial viability of hosting games at the more expensive Suncorp Stadium.

Following the flooding of Suncorp Stadium in the 2010–11 Queensland floods, the Roar were forced to move two home games against Wellington Phoenix and Melbourne Heart to the regular home of Gold Coast United at Skilled Park on the Gold Coast. These matches are the first 'home' league fixtures that the Roar have played at a venue other than Suncorp Stadium in the club's history.

Largest Attendances
In a spectacular 2011 A-League Grand Final, the 50,168 strong fans would make history, being the largest crowd to watch both the Roar and a football match in Brisbane. This was bettered the following season when 50,334 people saw Brisbane defeat Perth in the 2012 A-League Grand Final. The attendance of the 2012 Grand Final would be bettered two years later when the 2013–14 Premiers, the Roar, would do the double, beating Western Sydney Wanderers in the 2014 A-League Grand Final in front of 51,153 passionate fans.

Training ground
Roar train at the Logan Football Complex in Heritage Park in the city of Logan. The complex becoming the club's first permanent training home ahead of the 2018–19 season. Prior to that the club had a nomadic existence moving between a variety of training venues in its first decade of operation.

The initial training ground was at Lions F.C. while the team was part of that club but moved to share Ballymore with the Queensland Rugby Union (QRU) in 2008.

During their 2015–16 campaign, the Nathan campus of Griffith University became Brisbane Roar's new training base, with the Roar's contract at long-time training venue Ballymore Stadium expiring, and the field at their previous Perry Park administration base not meeting the standards required by the Roar.

In 2016, Brisbane Roar announced the club would move to a permanent administration and training facility in Logan City. The $9 million Logan Metro Sports Park would also be the headquarters to the club's academy, youth and women's sides, as well as Football Brisbane.

In mid-2017, Roar announced a 5-year deal with QUT to locate their U12-U16 Academy teams at QUT's Kelvin Grove sportsground in Brisbane's North. Prior to the commencement of the 2016–17 season, it was announced that Brisbane would return to Ballymore until their new Logan training centre is complete.

In March 2018 the club formally opened their state-of-the-art Logan Center-of-Excellence with Administration moving in immediately and pre-season training for the men's team commencing in June 2018

In October 2020, the Roar moved their training base to the Gold Coast Sports Precinct in the suburb of Carrara, Queensland.

Affiliations
 Queensland Lions – Founded the club and withdrew their Senior Men’s team from local competition to enter it as Queensland Roar in the inaugural A-League season. Cooperation between the two clubs continues today.
Academy Partners – Roar have affiliations with several local clubs as part of their Academy Preparation Program. Partnerships include Souths United, Gold Coast City, Grange Thistle SC, Sunshine Coast Wanderers F.C., Cairns F.C., Logan Lightning FC and Olympic FC
Gareth Edds Soccer Academy  – in Townsville, QLD, the BRFC Academy is represented by GESA
Player Development Project – in July 2018 Roar were announced as a founding partner in the 'Player Development Project' along with Birmingham City FC, Fulham FC and AIK FC. A program designed to help clubs create a learning environment for their coaches
East Coast Futsal Academy – in June 2019 a partnership between East Coast Futsal Academy in Port Macquarie and the Roar was announced specifically targeting players aged 13–16.

Ownership and finances

Current owners (2011–present)
Currently, the club is owned 100% by Bakrie Group.

In March 2011, just a week after the club won its first Grand Final, the FFA would take back the club's licence, agreeing to fund the club until new owners were found.

Football Federation Australia CEO Ben Buckley thanked the previous owners for pouring money into the Roar, who stayed they could not keep up with the future costs for the club.

On 4 October 2011, The World Game reported that Indonesian conglomerate, Bakrie Group, would takeover ownership of the club from the FFA under a 10-year term. Under the terms of the deal, Bakrie Group paid A$8 million for a 70% share of the club, with the FFA retaining the remaining 30% share. Under the terms of this deal, Bakrie Group had the option to purchase a further 20% stake in the club with the FFA holding the remaining 10% share. Following this change of ownership, the new chairman of the Roar was announced as Dali Tahir.

After becoming the first majority-share foreign owner of an A-League team, on 6 February 2012, the FFA announced that Bakrie Group had acquired 100 percent ownership of the Brisbane club.

Previous owners (2009–11)
On 16 April 2009 reports surfaced that the FFA were willing to purchase up to a 55% share in the Roar to ensure its financial stability. This 55% encompassed CEO Lawrence Oudendyk's 15% per cent interest, the 25% previously owned by Queensland Lions and the 15% share owned by Rob Jones and Rob Jansen.

The FFA advised that any takeover by the FFA would see Oudendyk replaced as CEO. Ultimately a new Brisbane-based ownership structure was formed with investors Emmanuel Drivas, Emmanuel Kokoris, Claude Baradel and Serge Baradel taking over 100% ownership of the club.

On 30 April 2009 the FFA confirmed their offer to take a controlling share in the Roar. The new ownership group declined the FFA's assistance on 22 May 2009. The owners' commitment to the club was reinforced in a statement released by Emmanuel Drivas on behalf of the owners on 12 April 2010 after further speculation that the Roar would require financial assistance from the FFA after a poor 2009–10 season.

Founding owners (2004–2008)
Brisbane Roar was established and owned by Queensland Lions SC in March 2005 as the team that would represent Brisbane in the newly formed A-League.

Queensland Lions held a majority share in the club through to 2008. It is understood that in 2008 the 25% share owned by Queensland Lions was bought by the Roar board at a discount. This led to financial instability in the club and rumours of the club handing back its A-League licence to Football Federation Australia (FFA).

Support
Brisbane Roar maintains one of the highest average attendances in the Hyundai A League, normally above the competition's season average, and by the end of 2018–19 a grand total of 2,544,306 supporters had seen Roar home games, giving a 14-season average attendance of 13,534.

The 2018–19 season saw Roar welcome their 2,500,000th A-League Fan through the gates.

Brisbane has two main supporters groups. The oldest is "The Den" which is the "Active Support Group" located in Bay 332 of the Northern stand of Suncorp Stadium, where they have been since the inaugural season of the A-League. As a Supporters group The Den can trace its origins back to Richlands and Lions F.C.

In 2016, the "Roar Supporters Federation" (RSF) were formed, which is a broad based supporters group intended to give a voice to all fans with club owners and management.

In October 2017, fans launched a dedicated supporters group for Brisbane's W-League side – "The Roar Corps" to be modelled on support groups in the American National Women's Soccer League.

Supporter groups have emerged in cities away from Brisbane including "Roar Fans in Melbourne", "Roar Fans in Sydney", "Roar Fans in Tasmania", "Roar Fans in Adelaide", and "Roar Fans on the Gold Coast".

Dispute between club and Active Support
In January 2019, Roar became the latest A-League club to become embroiled in a dispute with active supporters.

Hours before kickoff of their round 14 fixture against Melbourne Victory the club announced that they were withdrawing their support from the incumbent steering committee of "The Den".

The remainder of the season was played out with no formal active support.

Rivalries
 The Roar currently have no rivals.
Gold Coast United – Now defunct. Known as the M1 Derby, it shared the name of the main highway between the two cities, the M1. Due to Brisbane's close proximity to the Gold Coast, Brisbane Roar's geographical derby opponent was naturally going to be Gold Coast United. The glitzy Coast side only won 1 more game between the two (4 to 3), having won the first 3 games, all in Gold Coast's first season of 2009–10. They would, however, win only 1 of the 6 other games the two sides would play. The rivalry, however, concluded on 5 April 2012 when Football Federation Australia officially announced the axing of the Gold Coast side. There was also a rivalry with (now defunct) North Queensland Fury due to both clubs being in the same state although it was widely considered a regular match due to the distance between the two teams. The Fury was axed just a year prior to Gold Coast United being culled.

Players

First team squad

Youth

Players to have been featured in a first-team matchday squad for Brisbane Roar in a competitive match

Club officials

Management

Football Department

Administration

Captaincy history

Brisbane have had seven captains throughout their A-League history with Matt McKay holding the position on two separate occasions:

Honours

BPL and A-League
 Brisbane Premier League
Winners (7): 1987, 1990, 1991, 1996, 2002, 2003, 2004
Runners-up (3): 1989, 1994, 2000

 Brisbane Premier League Finals
Winners (5): 1987, 1991, 1996, 2002, 2003, 2004
Runners-up (1): 1990

 A-League Men Premiership
Winners (2): 2010–11, 2013–14
Runners-up (1): 2011–12

 A-League Men Championship
Winners (3): 2011, 2012, 2014

Domestic cups
 NSL Cup
 Winners (1): 1981

Records

Most consecutive games without defeat 
Brisbane hold the Australian record of 36 consecutive games without defeat. 18 September 2010 – 26 November 2011

Most consecutive away games without defeat 

16 away games between 3 October 2010 and 19 November 2011. This is also an A-League record.

Biggest win
Brisbane Roar 7, Adelaide United 1 on 28 October 2011.

Biggest defeat
0-5 against Melbourne Victory, A-League, 15 January 2019

Fastest goal scored
Bersart Berisha holds the record for the fastest goal scored, scoring in the first minute of the 3–2 win over Melbourne Victory on 18 February 2012. The goal was recorded as 43 seconds.

Fastest goal conceded
Aaron Calver scored for Sydney with just 40 seconds on the clock in their 3–1 win over Brisbane at Suncorp Stadium on 29 March 2019.

Most appearances
Matt McKay holds the record for most appearances with 272, including 270 starts for a total of 23,691 minutes played.

All-time Top Scorer
Bersart Berisha is the club's all-time top scorer with 50 goals in 84 appearances between 2011 and 2014. Berisha scored 48 league goals in 76 appearances plus 2 goals in the Asian Champions League.

Fastest hat-trick
6 minutes, Besart Berisha v Adelaide United, 28 October 2011.

Highest attendance
Brisbane's highest attendance is 51,153 for the 2014 Grand Final vs. Western Sydney Wanderers.

Most games coached
John Aloisi holds the record for most A-League games coached with 95 games between 2015 and 2018. Aloisi won 38, drew 23 and lost 34 of those games. With a win ratio of 40%.

Youngest player
Izaack Powell became the youngest player to represent Brisbane Roar in the Hyundai A-League when he made his debut off the bench against Sydney FC at just 16 years, 361 days on 8 February 2019.

On 7 August 2019, Jordan Courtney-Perkins made his professional debut in a 2–0 win against Sydney FC in the 2019 FFA Cup, playing a full game in a 2–0 victory. In doing so, he became the youngest player to play for the Brisbane Roar at 16 years, 9 months and 1 days.

Youngest goal scorer
Tommy Oar is the youngest player to score a goal at the age of 17 years and 18 days old vs Wellington Phoenix in Round 17 of the 2008–09 season.

Hall of Fame

Thomas Broich
In May 2017 Thomas Broich became the first inductee to the BRFC 'Hall of Fame'.

Broich played 181 games for Roar between 2010 and 2017. In that time he won the Johnny Warren Medal twice, three A-League Championships, two A-League Premierships and a two time Gary Wilkins Medal winner, in addition, in 2014, Broich was awarded the Joe Marston Medal.

Broich is considered one of the greatest players in A-League history. With 21 career goals and 66 assists, Broich is the leading assister in A-League history.

Michael Theo
In May 2017 Michael Theo was inducted in to the Hall of Fame making 159 appearances between 2010 and 2018. Theo won two A-League Premierships with Roar in 2010–11 and 2013–14 and three Championships in 2010–2011, 2011–2012, 2013–2014.

He was also voted A-League 'Goalkeeper of the Year' in 2010 and holds the record for the most minutes (876) played not conceding a goal in an Australian League 2010–11).

Matt McKay
In May 2019 former Captain and club appearance record holder, Matt McKay, was inducted in to the 'Hall of Fame'.

McKay made 272 appearances across 2 spells with Roar in addition to 59 Socceroos caps. McKay won two championships with Roar.

Academy
In July 2020 the club announced a partnership with Morton Bay Council for the development of an $18m training facility for use of the W-League team and the club's Academy

The Roar Academy has three pathways:

Brisbane Academy
The Club launched its Academy in January 2018. and provides development for boys in the U14 age group through to U19.

Pre-Academy
The Pre-Academy serves players in the U10 age group up to U13 and is delivered through a network of partner clubs.

Pathway for Girls
The Academy does not currently accommodate girls. Instead BRFC and Football Queensland partner to deliver the National Training Center (NTC) curriculum. Development teams compete in National Premier Leagues (Queensland) under the name "Brisbane Roar NTC" in acknowledgment of this partnership.

Controversies

In 2009 Football Federation Australia revoked the clubs Licence to participate. In addition, there were suggestions the FFA would use this opportunity to change certain branding elements including colours and the lion on the shirt. These changes did not eventuate but the club's name was changed to reflect its identity as a Brisbane club rather than a state-wide franchise.

In 2009, head coach Frank Farina's second charge for drink-driving within two-and-a-half years occurred as he made his way to training, which forced Roar to launch an internal investigation, that led to his sacking.

In 2012, Ange Postecoglou, the mastermind behind Brisbane Roar's historic back-to-back A-League championships, quit the club two days after Roar's second title victory to join bitter rivals Melbourne Victory.

in 2014, head coach Mike Mulvey was sacked weeks in to the new season, and less than 6 months after guiding Roar to a Premiers Plate and Championship double.

In 2015, Roar switched their home Asian Champions League games away from Brisbane and instead played them on The Gold Coast, a distance of 83 km. The move angered many supporters.

In 2015 the club endured a financial crisis with FFA CEO David Gallop instructed the club owners to immediately address the Roar's financial problems or have their A-League licence revoked. Bakrie Group injected an initial sum of $1m to stabilise the club's finances before successfully retaining ownership of the club.

In 2015, star midfielder Luke Brattan walked out on the club over unpaid Super contributions.

in 2016, Chief executive David Pourre resigned from his role to take up a new opportunity outside of the sports industry.

In 2016, Roar Director Daniel Cobb blamed Bakrie Group for late player payments. A crisis engulfed Brisbane Roar when the club's managing director effectively accused club owners of lying over promises to fund the club properly. Cobb eventually quit on the eve of the season start.

in 2017, Brisbane Roar celebrated their 60th anniversary. The history of the Roar had often been muddied since the A-League license first changed hands in 2008; legendary soccer writer Michael Cockerill wrote "rightfully, the owners have opted to respect history, rather than trash it".

In 2017, just 14 months after being appointed by club owners to replace Cobb, MD Mark Kingsman was fired in a surprise move by Roar chairman Rahim Soekasah who cited continued growth, greater governance and oversight and deeper connection with members, the business sector and the wider community as reasons for the move.

In 2018, Roar's'peeling shirt numbers and a shock loss to Ceres-Negros in the Asian Champions League caused embarrassment with supporters calling it the "lowest moment in the club's history". The club were forced to make a public apology in relation to the incident.

In 2019, in January the organising committee of 'The Den' supporters group withdrew organisation of Active Support issued demands on the club and refused to organise support for games until they were met, in response the club withdrew recognition of the organising committee.

See also

Brisbane Roar FC (W-League)
Brisbane Roar FC Reserves
Season History

References

External links
 

 
A-League Men teams
Bakrie Group
Soccer clubs in Brisbane
Association football clubs established in 1957
1957 establishments in Australia